Kampoayargo, also spelt Kampoa Yargo, Kompoueyorgho, Kampayargo and Compo-Yorgo, is a commune in the Dialgaye Department of Kouritenga Province in the Centre-Est region of Burkina Faso. It had a population of 853 in 2006.

Demographics

Neighbourhoods

References 

Populated places in the Centre-Est Region